"Privilege (Set Me Free)" is a song by the Patti Smith Group and released as the second single from their 1978 album Easter. The original version of the song was titled "Free Me" and was written by Mel London and Mike Leander for the 1967 film Privilege. Patti spoke sections of Psalm 23 over the instrumental bridge among other lyrical additions.

Liner notes 
The following is quoted from the album:
the title track from the john hayman-peter watkins production of the film privilege. a movie that
merged the rock martyr (paul jones) with all the  images of the sixties...the cross..
the christ..the whip and the lashes that served to veil velvet weeping balls-the eyes
of jean shrimpton.

Charts

Notes

External links 
 Lyrics

1978 singles
Patti Smith songs
Songs written by Mike Leander
Song recordings produced by Jimmy Iovine
1967 songs
Arista Records singles
Songs written by Mel London
Songs written for films